Muge is a surname. Notable people with the surname include:

Alexander Muge (1948–1990), Kenyan Anglican bishop
Amélia Muge (born 1952), Mozambique-born Portuguese singer, instrumentalist, composer, and lyricist
Some Muge (1959–1997), Kenyan long-distance runner

See also
Müge, a given name